Suillus punctipes, commonly known as the spicy suillus, is a bolete fungus in the family Suillaceae.

Taxonomy
The fungus was originally described in 1878 by American mycologist Charles Horton Peck as a species of Boletus. Collected from Gansevoort, New York, Peck described its distinguishing features as "its rhubarb-colored stem thickened at the base and the brownish color of the young hymenium". Rolf Singer transferred it to Suillus in 1945.

Habitat and distribution
The bolete has been recorded from Taiwan.

Uses
The species is edible but very soft.

See also
List of North American boletes

References

External links

Edible fungi
Fungi described in 1878
Fungi of Asia
Fungi of North America
punctipes
Taxa named by Charles Horton Peck